Josh Judge is a meteorologist and real estate agent. He presents weather at WMUR-TV in Manchester, New Hampshire. Since 2018 he has been a full-time real estate agent, quickly becoming one of the top agents in his company. Judge still forecasts the weather part-time. His forecasts reach over 670,500 people in New Hampshire and the surrounding states.

His personal webpage is: www.joshjudge.com

Judge joined the WMUR as a part-time employee in April 2001, while he also worked on-air at WHDH-TV in Boston, Massachusetts, and WGME-TV in Portland, Maine.  Judge became full-time at WMUR in 2003.  Judge received the CBM seal (Certified Broadcast Meteorologist from the AMS) in 2006, and was among the first few in New England to receive it.

Judge entered broadcasting when he was 12 years old, and when he was a senior in high school, he had his own radio show.

While in college, Judge worked in Boston (Massachusetts) radio as a DJ, and also worked as a helicopter traffic reporter. Judge spent eight years hosting a radio morning show on New Hampshire's Seacoast 102 WZEA-FM (where he won the New Hampshire Association of Broadcasters' "Air Personality of the Year" award in 1993) and later on Arrow 105.3 FM.  After that, Judge returned to college to study weather forecasting and meteorology.

On December 8, 2006, Judge was involved in a hit-and-run accident, which left him with a fractured skull and other injuries. It took months before Judge could return to WMUR.

Judge has been voted "Best TV Weathercaster" in the New Hampshire Magazine readers poll many times, has been voted "Best NH TV Personality" in the "Hippo readers Poll", and has received several other awards as well, including the 2008 "Golden Mike Award" from the NH Association of Broadcasters.

Judge's latest book was released in early November 2010, called, "Extreme New England Weather." "" The book profiles New England's strong storms and past historical accounts of many of the area's biggest storms.  The book also features contributions from over 15 of New England's well-known television meteorologists, a chapter written by the staff of the Mount Washington Observatory, and hundreds of pictures.  The book is reported to have sold over 5,000 copies in its first month alone.

In 2009, Judge wrote a children's book with Kathe Cussen about weather, titled "Weather Facts and Fun".

Judge, his son Adam, and adopted daughter Adelina, live in southern New Hampshire.

References

External links

American television meteorologists
Living people
Year of birth missing (living people)